Mountain Justice  is a 1937 film directed by Michael Curtiz. It was produced and distributed by Warner Brothers. It is loosely based on the story of Edith Maxwell, who was convicted in 1935 of murdering her coal miner father in Pound, Virginia.

Plot

Cast
Josephine Hutchinson - Ruth Harkins
George Brent - Paul Cameron
Guy Kibbee - Dr. John Barnard
Mona Barrie - Evelyn Wayne
Robert Barrat - Jeff Harkins
Margaret Hamilton - Phoebe Lamb
Robert McWade - Horace Bamber
Fuzzy Knight - Clem Biggars
Edward Pawley - Tad Miller
Elizabeth Risdon - Meg Harkins
Granville Bates - Judge Crawley
Russell Simpson - Mr. Turnbull
Sybil Harris - Mrs. Turnbull
Guy Wilkerson - Asaph Anderson
Marcia Mae Jones - Bethie Harkins

Preservation
 A print is held by the Library of Congress.

References

External links

1937 films
Films directed by Michael Curtiz
Films scored by Heinz Roemheld
1937 drama films
American black-and-white films
Warner Bros. films
American drama films
1930s English-language films
1930s American films
Films scored by Bernhard Kaun